The Earl or Mormaer of Lennox was the ruler of the region of the Lennox in western Scotland. It was first created in the 12th century for David of Scotland, Earl of Huntingdon and later held by the Stewart dynasty.

Ancient earls

The first earl recorded is Ailin I, sometimes called 'Alwin'. He is traditionally said to have been created Earl of Lennox by King Malcolm IV in 1154, but this is likely too early a date. [Note: Other sources say Arkil (Arkyll) was the first mormaer. He fled Northumberland for Scotland about 1070 and was made Mormaer of Levenax by Malcolm. That title was in the 12th century changed to earl of Lennox.] The earldom may in fact have been created in the late twelfth century by King William the Lion for his brother David, and after David gained the higher title Earl of Huntingdon, he resigned the Earldom of Lennox and it passed to Ailin.

Earl Ailin's parentage and background is unknown. His line continued as Earls of Lennox until the time of Earl Duncan in the fifteenth century. Duncan's daughter Isabella married Murdoch, son of Robert, Duke of Albany. Duncan hoped this marriage would improve the family's prospects, but it would in fact be their downfall. Duke Robert had infamously murdered David, the heir to the throne, and when David's brother James became king, he wreaked his vengeance: almost the entire family were executed, including Earl Duncan, despite the fact he had had no part in the murder.

Isabella was imprisoned in Tantallon Castle, but she escaped execution, and succeeded her father as Countess of Lennox. All four of her sons died in her lifetime: two from King James's retribution, and two from natural causes. She had several grandsons, but none of them were legitimate, and the earldom therefore died with her around the year 1457.

Stewart earls

In 1473 the earldom was reclaimed by Sir John Stewart of Darnley, who was the grandson of Elizabeth Lennox, daughter to Earl Duncan and sister to Countess Isabella. In 1565 his great-great-great-grandson Henry, Lord Darnley married Mary, Queen of Scots. He would be murdered at Kirk o' Field in 1567, and therefore on the death of his father Earl Matthew, the earldom of Lennox passed to James, the son of Henry and Mary. James would accede as King of Scots a few months later, and the title consequently merged with the Crown.

In 1572, the earldom was conferred upon King James's uncle Charles. He did not long enjoy the title, for he died four years later at the age of twenty-one. It was next granted to the king's great-uncle Robert in 1578. This Robert, described as being "symple and of lyttle action or accomte", was persuaded to exchange the earldom of Lennox for the earldom of March, so that the king could give the former title to his friend and cousin Esmé. In 1581, Esmé's earldom was raised to a dukedom, and his line continued as Dukes of Lennox until the time of his great-grandson Charles, who died childless in 1672 after drowning at Elsinore while on a diplomatic mission to the Danish government.

In 1675, the Dukedom of Lennox was conferred upon Charles, bastard son of King Charles II, along with the English Dukedom of Richmond and several other titles. However, he would later sell his lands in the Lennox to the Duke of Montrose, meaning he became Duke of Lennox in name alone. This line survives today, and is currently headed by another Charles. Despite being Stewarts, they used "Lennox" as their surname, which was changed to "Gordon-Lennox" in the 19th century after the fourth Duke married Lady Charlotte Gordon, sister and heiress to George, Duke of Gordon.

List of earls and dukes of Lennox

Earls of Lennox (12th century)
David, Earl of Huntingdon (died 1219) [first known holder]
Ailin I, Earl of Lennox (d. c. 1200)
Ailin II, Earl of Lennox (d. 1217)
Maldouen, Earl of Lennox (d. 1250)
Malcolm I, Earl of Lennox (d. 1303)
Malcolm II, Earl of Lennox (d. 1333)
Donald, Earl of Lennox (d. 1365)
Margaret, Countess of Lennox (?) (resigned 1385)
 m. Walter of Faslane, descendant of the second Earl.
Duncan, Earl of Lennox (d. 1425)
Isabella, Countess of Lennox (d. 1458)
 m. Murdoch Stewart, Duke of Albany
The title became extinct c. 1459, as all four sons of Countess Isabella died without legitimate issue.

Earls of Lennox (2nd creation) (1488)

John Stewart, 1st Earl of Lennox (d. 1495);
Matthew Stewart, 2nd Earl of Lennox (1488–1513), killed at the Battle of Flodden;
John Stewart, 3rd Earl of Lennox (d. 1526);
Matthew Stewart, 4th Earl of Lennox (1516–1571);
Henry Stewart, Lord Darnley (1545–1567), eldest son and heir apparent to the earldom who predeceased his father. He married his half-first cousin Mary, Queen of Scots, daughter and heiress of King James V of Scotland, by whom he was the father of King James VI of Scotland and I of England (lived 1566–1625), who inherited the earldom on the death of his grandfather the 4th Earl, whereupon it merged with the Crown, but was re-created by the king for his uncle.

Earls of Lennox, third creation (c. 1571)
Charles Stewart, Earl of Lennox (1555–1576), second son of the 4th Earl of the second creation.

Earls of Lennox, fourth creation (1578)
Robert Stewart, Earl of Lennox, "exchanged" for the Earldom of March in 1580, second son of the third Earl of the second creation.

Earls of Lennox, fifth creation (1580)
Esmé Stewart, Earl of Lennox (1542–1583), grandson of the third Earl of the second creation through his third son John.

Dukes of Lennox, first creation (1581)
Esmé Stewart, Duke of Lennox (1542–1583)
Ludovic Stewart, Duke of Lennox and Richmond (1574–1623)
Esmé Stewart, Duke of Lennox (1579–1624)
James Stewart, Duke of Lennox and Richmond (1612–1655)
Esmé Stewart, Duke of Lennox and Richmond (1649–1660)
Charles Stewart, Duke of Lennox and Richmond (1639–1672) (extinct)

Dukes of Lennox, second creation (1675)
Charles Lennox, Duke of Lennox and Richmond (1672–1723)
Charles Lennox, Duke of Lennox and Richmond (1701–1750)
Charles Lennox, Duke of Lennox and Richmond (1736–1806)
Charles Lennox, Duke of Lennox and Richmond (1764–1819)
Charles Gordon-Lennox, Duke of Lennox and Richmond (1791–1860)
Charles Gordon-Lennox, Duke of Lennox, Richmond and Gordon (1818–1903)
Charles Gordon-Lennox, Duke of Lennox, Richmond and Gordon (1845–1928)
Charles Gordon-Lennox, Duke of Lennox, Richmond and Gordon (1870–1935)
Frederick Gordon-Lennox, Duke of Lennox, Richmond and Gordon (1904–1989)
Charles Gordon-Lennox, Duke of Lennox, Richmond and Gordon (1929–2017)
Charles Gordon-Lennox, Duke of Lennox, Richmond and Gordon (b. 1955)

Stewart family

Ludovic Stewart, 1st Duke of Richmond, 2nd Duke of Lennox
Ludovic Stewart, 1st Duke of Richmond, 2nd Duke of Lennox (1574–1624), was the eldest son and heir of Esmé Stewart, 1st Duke of Lennox, 1st Earl of Lennox (1542–1583), a Roman Catholic French nobleman of Scottish ancestry who on his move to Scotland at the age of 37 became a favorite of the 13-year-old King James VI of Scotland (later James I of England), of whose father, Henry Stewart, Lord Darnley, he was a first cousin. In 1579/80 Esmé Stewart was created Earl of Lennox, Lord Darnley, Aubigny and Dalkeith and in 1581 he was created Duke of Lennox, Earl of Darnley, Lord Aubigny, Dalkeith, Torboltoun and Aberdour.

The founder of the French branch of the Stewart family of Darnley in Renfrewshire, Scotland, was Sir John Stewart of Darnley (c. 1380 – 1429), 1st Seigneur de Concressault, 1st Seigneur d'Aubigny, 1st Comte d'Évreux, a famous warrior who commanded the Scottish army in France assisting the French King Charles VII to expel the invading English forces under King Henry V during the Hundred Years War. He was much appreciated by the French king who showered him with honours and landed estates and granted him the "glorious privilege of quartering the royal arms of France with his paternal arms". The residence of the Stewart family in France was the Château d'Aubigny, Aubigny-sur-Nère, in the ancient county of Berry.

King James I regarded all Esmé's family with great affection, and instructed his son King Charles I to do well by them. Charles faithfully fulfilled this obligation, and as a result the Lennox family had considerable influence at the Scottish and English Courts over the next two generations. In 1603 as well as being granted the reversion of Cobham Hall, he was also granted the possession of Temple Newsam Hall in Yorkshire, the birthplace of Henry Stewart, Lord Darnley, father of King James I and first cousin of Ludovic's father. In 1613 Ludovic Stewart was created Baron of Settrington (of Yorkshire) and Earl of Richmond (of Yorkshire) and in 1623 Earl of Newcastle-Upon-Tyne and Duke of Richmond. He married three times but died on 16 February 1623/4, aged 50, without legitimate issue, when all his titles, excepting those inherited from his father, became extinct. He was buried in Westminster Abbey, in the Richmond Vault in the Henry VII Chapel (that king formerly having been Earl of Richmond) above which survives his magnificent black marble monument by Hubert Le Sueur with gilt-bronze recumbent effigies of himself and his wife.

Esmé Stewart, 3rd Duke of Lennox
Esmé Stewart, 3rd Duke of Lennox (1579–1624), younger brother and heir, who had succeeded his father as 7th Seigneur d'Aubigny (which French title was able to be passed directly to a younger son). He died on 30 July 1624 of spotted fever, just 5 months after his elder brother. He married Katherine Clifton, 2nd Baroness Clifton (c. 1592 – 1637) of Leighton Bromswold, Huntingdonshire, as a consequence of which in 1619 he was created Baron Stuart of Leighton Bromswold and Earl of March. He was buried in Westminster Abbey.

James Stewart, 1st Duke of Richmond, 4th Duke of Lennox
James Stewart, 1st Duke of Richmond, 4th Duke of Lennox (1612–1655), son and heir, a third cousin of King Charles I. In 1624 King James I created the 12-year-old newly-fatherless James Stewart as Duke of Richmond and in 1628, following the death of Frances Howard (Lady Cobham), he gained vacant possession of Cobham Hall, which became his main residence. He was a key member of Royalist party in the English Civil War and in 1641–42 he served as Lord Warden of the Cinque Ports, which office was administered from nearby Dover Castle in Kent. He married Mary Villiers, daughter of George Villiers, 1st Duke of Buckingham.

Esmé Stuart, 2nd Duke of Richmond, 5th Duke of Lennox
Esmé Stuart, 2nd Duke of Richmond, 5th Duke of Lennox (1649–1660) was the infant son the 1st Duke. On his father's death when he was aged 6, and following the defeat of the royalist faction in the Civil War, he and his mother went into exile in France, where he died of the smallpox aged 10 in 1660 (the year of the Restoration of the Monarchy), when his titles passed to his first cousin Charles Stewart, 3rd Duke of Richmond, 6th Duke of Lennox. He was buried in Westminster Abbey, where survives his monument, a black obelisk surmounted by an urn containing his heart.

Charles Stewart, 3rd Duke of Richmond, 6th Duke of Lennox
Charles Stewart, 3rd Duke of Richmond, 6th Duke of Lennox (1639–1672) was the only son of George Stewart, 9th Seigneur d'Aubigny (1618–1642) (a younger brother of the 1st & 4th Duke), by his wife Katherine Howard, a daughter of Theophilus Howard, 2nd Earl of Suffolk. He was appointed joint Lord Lieutenant of Kent and Vice-Admiral of Kent. With the Civil War over and the Stuart monarchy restored, he re-built the central block at Cobham Hall, between 1662 and 1672, to the design of the architect Peter Mills. His "Gilt Hall" of 1672 (with marble wall decorations added in the 18th c. by James Wyatt) was considered by King George IV to be the finest room in England. He married three times but died childless.

Family tree

See also
Duke of Lennox
Seigneur d'Aubigny
Earl of Richmond

References

 Anderson, John, "The Celtic Earls of Lennox" in Sir James Paul (ed.) The Scots Peerage Vol. 5, (Edinburgh, 1909), pp. 324–343
 Steuart, A., "Stewart, Duke of Lennox" in Sir James Paul (ed.) The Scots Peerage Vol. 5, (Edinburgh, 1909), pp. 344–362
 Grant, Francis, "Lennox, Duke of Lennox" in Sir James Paul (ed.) The Scots Peerage Vol. 5, (Edinburgh, 1909), pp. 363–371
 Brown, Michael, "Earldom and Kindred: The Lennox and Its Earls, 1200–1458" in Steve Boardman and Alasdair Ross (eds.) The Exercise of Power in Medieval Scotland, c.1200–1500, (Dublin/Portland, 2003), pp. 201–224 
 Neville, Cynthia J., Native Lordship in Medieval Scotland: The Earldoms of Strathearn and Lennox, c. 1140–1365, (Portland & Dublin, 2005)

Further reading

Earldoms in the Peerage of Scotland
West Dunbartonshire
East Dunbartonshire
 
Noble titles created in 1184
Noble titles created in 1488
Noble titles created in 1572
Noble titles created in 1578
Noble titles created in 1580
Vale of Leven